Abdul Halim (born 2 November 1998) is a Bangladeshi first-class and List A cricketer. In December 2015 he was named in Bangladesh's squad for the 2016 Under-19 Cricket World Cup. He made his Twenty20 debut on 31 May 2021, for Sheikh Jamal Dhanmondi Club in the 2021 Dhaka Premier Division Twenty20 Cricket League.

References

External links
 

1998 births
Living people
Bangladeshi cricketers
Khulna Division cricketers
Bangladesh East Zone cricketers
Sheikh Jamal Dhanmondi Club cricketers
City Club cricketers